Kansas's 6th congressional district is an obsolete district for representation in the United States House of Representatives.

It existed from 1885 to 1963. Before it was eliminated Bob Dole was the final person to represent the district. In its final configuration, it was located in north central and northwest Kansas, anchored by Hays, with Goodland at the western edge of the district and Salina and Concordia at the eastern edge.

List of members representing the district

References

 Congressional Biographical Directory of the United States 1774–present

Former congressional districts of the United States
06